John Davis is an American para-alpine skier. He represented the United States at the 1994 Winter Paralympics and at the 1998 Winter Paralympics.

In 1994 he won the gold medal in the Men's Giant Slalom LWXI event and in 1998 he won the gold medal in the Men's Downhill LW11 event.

See also 
 List of Paralympic medalists in alpine skiing

References 

Living people
Year of birth missing (living people)
Place of birth missing (living people)
Paralympic alpine skiers of the United States
American male alpine skiers
Alpine skiers at the 1994 Winter Paralympics
Alpine skiers at the 1998 Winter Paralympics
Medalists at the 1994 Winter Paralympics
Medalists at the 1998 Winter Paralympics
Paralympic gold medalists for the United States
Paralympic medalists in alpine skiing